The European Health Data Space (EHDS) is a data sharing framework for health data in the European Union. The EHDS was tabled as a regulatory proposal by the European Commission on 3 May 2022. It aims to provide EU citizens better control over their personal health data. Its objective is also to ensure that various relevant actors such as researchers and policy-makers have access to health data.

See also 

 Healthcare in the European Union
 Data Act
 Data Governance Act
 General Data Protection Regulation

References

External links 

 Proposal for a REGULATION OF THE EUROPEAN PARLIAMENT AND OF THE COUNCIL on the European Health Data Space
 European Parliament Legislative Observatory page for EHDS regulation
 European Commission European Health Data Space explainer page

2022 in the European Union
European Digital Strategy
Policies of the European Union
Data laws of Europe
Database law
Health and the European Union